Coptops annobonae is a species of beetle in the family Cerambycidae. It was described by Aurivillius in 1910. It occurs on the island of Annobón, Equatorial Guinea.

References

annobonae
Fauna of Annobón
Insects of Equatorial Guinea
Beetles of Africa
Beetles described in 1910
Taxa named by Per Olof Christopher Aurivillius